Giorgio Biandrata or Blandrata (15155 May 1588) was an Italian-born Transylvanian physician and polemicist, who came of the De Biandrate family, powerful from the early part of the 13th century. He was a Unitarian.

Biandrata was born at Saluzzo, the youngest son of Bernardino Biandrata.  He graduated in arts and medicine at Montpellier in 1533, and specialized in the functional and nervous disorders of women. In 1544 he made his first trip to Transylvania; in 1553 he was with Giovanni Paolo Alciati in the Grisons; in 1557 he spent a year at Geneva, in constant contact with Calvin, who distrusted him.

He attended a Jane Stafford, English wife of Count Celso Massimiliano Martinengo, preacher of the Italian church at Geneva, and fostered anti-trinitarian opinions in that church. In 1558 he found it expedient to move to Poland, where he became a leader of the heretical party at the synods of Pińczów (1558) and Książ Wielkopolski (1560 and 1562). His point was the suppression of extremes of opinion, on the basis of a confession literally drawn from Scripture.

He obtained the position of court physician to the queen dowager, the Milanese Bona Sforza. She had been instrumental in the burning (1539) of Catharine Weygel, at the age of eighty, for anti-trinitarian opinions; but the writings of Ochino had altered her views, which were now anti-Catholic.

In 1563 Biandrata transferred his services to the Transylvanian court of John Sigismund Zápolya, where the daughters of his patroness were married to ruling princes. He revisited Poland (1576) in the train of Stephen Báthory, whose tolerance permitted the propagation of heresies; and when (1579) Christopher Báthory introduced the Jesuits into Transylvania, Biandrata found means of conciliating them.

Throughout his career he was accompanied by his two brothers, Ludovico and Alphonso, the former being canon of Saluzzo. In Transylvania, Biandrata co-operated with Francis David (d. 1579), the leader of the Calvinist church, who then became the first anti-trinitarian bishop. Together, they published some polemical writings against Trinitarian belief, particularly De falsa et vera unius Dei Patris, Filii et Spiritus Sancti cognitione, which is largely a summarized version of Servetus's Christianismi Restitutio. But in 1578 two circumstances broke the connection. Biandrata was charged with immorality and David renounced the necessity of invoking Christ in prayer.

To influence David, Biandrata sent for Faustus Socinus from Basel. Socinus was David's guest, but the discussion between them led to no result. At the instance of Biandrata, David was tried and condemned to prison at the Fortress of Deva on the charge of "innovation", where he died.

Having amassed a fortune, Biandrata returned to the communion of Rome. His end is obscure. According to the Jesuit, Jakub Wujek, he was strangled by a nephew (Giorgio, son of Alphonso) at Gyulafehérvár, in May 1588.

References 

Malacarne, Commentario delle Opere e delle Vicende di G. Biandrata (Padova, 1814);
Robert Wallace, Anti-trinitarian Biography, vol. ii (1850).

1510s births
1588 deaths
Italian Unitarians
Antitrinitarians
16th-century Italian physicians
People from Saluzzo
Eastern Hungarian Kingdom